Intersect, known as Digidrive in North America and Japan, is a puzzle video game developed by Q-Games and published by Nintendo for the Game Boy Advance in 2006 exclusively in Japan. It is the only game in the bit Generations series to not be developed by Skip Ltd. It was later re-released for the Nintendo DSi's DSiWare digital distribution service, where it was released outside Japan for the first time.

The inspiration came from the police direction of the floats during the Gion Festival in Kyoto.

Gameplay
The objective of the game is to propel the disc-shaped corevto as many meters as possible before the piston collides into the core and ends the game. The player must direct up to three different varieties of "vehicle," each of a different color, into one of four different lanes. If five of the same vehicle fill up the same lane, a triangle will appear and the lane will change to the same color as the type of vehicle that entered this lane.

Once the player get all five cars of the same color in all four directions, it results in an overdrive, where they can send vehicles of their color in the direction of that color before the color in that direction goes away, but once the vehicle goes in the right direction, it fills that direction up.  Overdrive ends when either a vehicle goes in the direction that does not match the color, or if a direction did not have a vehicle of that color in that direction in the last few seconds.

Reception

Intersect has received a score of 83/100 on Metacritic based on 6 reviews, indicating "generally favorable" reviews.

References

DSiWare games
Game Boy Advance games
2009 video games
Puzzle video games
Video games developed in Japan

Nintendo games
Single-player video games
Q-Games games